() is a slogan used by feminists in Pakistan to demand bodily autonomy and protest gender-based violence.

The slogan was popularized during the Aurat March in Pakistan, which has been observed on International Women's Day since 2018.

Origin and background 

The slogan was first chanted in Pakistan during the 2018 Aurat March. Protestors and organizers carried signs with different slogans, including . 

The march came under harsh criticism from conservatives, who said that the march opposed typical religious and cultural values of Pakistani society, which is patriarchal and predominantly Muslim. These conservatives said that the slogan was a call for vulgarity and nudity. However, feminists said that the slogan should be interpreted in a broader sense: they were protesting against abuse and harassment. More specifically, they use the slogan because they believe that women should not be touched or pursued sexually against their will. According to Muhammad Anwar Nasar, the slogan is symbolic, not literal. The expression underlines the structural violence, injustices, and inequality inflicted on Pakistani women. By using this slogan, Pakistani feminists protest honor killings, acid attacks, harassment in public places and offices, child rape, forced pregnancy, female genital mutilation, forced child marriages, the vani custom, and domestic violence. The slogan also demands an equitable world without sexism.

Zainab Najeeb, a reporter, advises opponents of the slogan not to misinterpret the language. Conservative opponents have said that the slogan supports prostitution and attacks morality; Najeeb disagrees. She contends that women are humans, and as humans they should have bodily autonomy. She argues that both the Constitution and Islamic texts recognize women as human beings, so no contradiction exists between the slogan and religious society. Najeeb asserts that  is a declaration of women's independence: the slogan defends a woman's right to dress as she pleases, to receive medical help without fear of social taboos, to be seen as a human rather than a "piece of meat", to choose a partner or to not have a partner at all, and to protect herself from harassment.

Usage 
The slogan was first used in Pakistan during the Aurat March in 2018. It saw use again during the 2019 Aurat March. It has been hotly debated in the Pakistan media and on social media platforms. For the most part, the slogan  has been criticized for not conforming to social norms. Feminists promote the slogan with the hashtag #MeraJismMeriMarzi on social media platforms. Those who oppose the slogan use the hashtag #WeRejectMeraJismMeriMarzi.

Variations 
The slogan  has led to new slogans. During the 2020 Aurat March, many protestors used slogans with similar meanings, such as:
 
 
 
 
 
 

Other heavily criticized slogans used during the Aurat March include:
 ("Why do I adopt the veil because of your bad habit of ogling?")
 ("If you like the scarf so much, then tie it around your eyes")
 ("If you do it, you're a stud, but if I do it, I'm a slut")
 ("Ready the food yourself")

Criticism 
The religious right criticized  and other slogans, including those mentioned above, because they believed that the slogans went against traditional values. Clergy labeled the slogan indecent, and a National Assembly panel called it "immoral". It was also criticized for not addressing the real issues that women in Pakistan face. Mera Jism Meri Marzi was discussed extensively on social media, and many conservatives started campaigns against it. It became a major tool in online fights, with both liberals and conservatives using the slogan to defend their own opinions or degrade others. The slogan was also debated in national media, with women's rights activists vouching for it and clergy calling it un-Islamic. Feminists defended the slogan, citing a February 2020 honor killing in which two brothers killed their sister and her child after the sister married a person of her own choice; the feiminists viewed the murder as an attack on the sister's bodily autonomy.

Controversies 
Writer Khalil ur Rehman Qamar appeared on a talk show on Neo News. During the debate, feminist activist Marvi Sirmed interrupted him by chanting "". He retaliated with sexist remarks and comments about her body, which led some to boycott him. He had previously been criticized for some of his remarks on his drama Meray Paas Tum Ho, which were interpreted as misogynistic. However, many people on social media defended Khalil ur Rehman Qamar and supported his statements.

Another case was also filed in the Islamabad High Court to stop the Aurat March. The court asked the petitioner how these slogans are un-Islamic and dismissed the petition.

Reciprocal slogans and meme war
In response to the Aurat March, some men organized the Mard March in Islamabad.

BBC Urdu reports that women who supported the  slogan in previous marches complain that they have received rape and death threats. They also say that some men have used the slogan to trivialize women's issues or to justify masturbating and flashing in public places. Others have misappropriated the slogan to mock serious crimes and deny equal opportunities to women.

In popular media and culture 
 'Aurat Gardi', a web series by Javeria Saud, endorsed the slogan.

See also 

 Aurat March
 Aurat Foundation
 Blue Veins
 Girls at Dhabas
 International Women's Day
 Me Too movement (Pakistan)
 Rape in Pakistan
 Violence against women in Pakistan
 Women in Islam
 Women's Action Forum
 Women's Protection Bill
 Women's rights

References

External links 

Aurat March on Facebook.

Feminist terminology
Gender-related stereotypes
Urdu-language words and phrases
Feminist works
Women's rights in Pakistan
Feminism in Pakistan